Neoduma simplex is a moth of the subfamily Arctiinae. It was described by Pagenstecher in 1900. It is found in New Britain.

References

 Natural History Museum Lepidoptera generic names catalog

Lithosiini
Moths described in 1900